Diego Armando Magdaleno (born October 28, 1986) is an American professional boxer. He challenged for the WBO super featherweight title in 2013 and the WBO lightweight title in 2015. At regional level, he held the WBC-NABF super featherweight title from 2011 to 2012. He's also the brother of boxer Jesús Magdaleno. He has been ranked in the top ten of The Ring magazine's super featherweight ratings.

Early life
He was named after Diego Maradona and is the brother of boxer Jesús Magdaleno.

Professional career
He is signed to Bob Arum's Top Rank.
In April 2010, Diego won a ten-round decision over Manuel Perez

After receiving a top ten Super Featherweight ranking by the Ring Magazine, Magdaleno beat contender Alejandro Pérez.

Professional boxing record

See also
 Notable boxing families

References

External links
 

American boxers of Mexican descent
Boxers from Nevada
Lightweight boxers
1986 births
Living people
American male boxers